Michael Braithwaite (born 2 March 1987 in Duncan, British Columbia) is a Canadian rower. He competed with Kevin Kowalyk in the double sculls at the 2012 Summer Olympics and they were eliminated in the semifinal, going on to place 6th in the B Final (12th overall).

References

External links 
 
 
 

1987 births
Living people
Canadian male rowers
People from Duncan, British Columbia
Rowers at the 2012 Summer Olympics
Olympic rowers of Canada
Rowers at the 2011 Pan American Games
Pan American Games competitors for Canada